Walker Whiteside (1869 – 1942) was an American actor who had played Hamlet, Othello, King Lear, and Shylock while still in his teens.

Early life
Walker Whiteside was born on March 16, 1869, near the confluence of the Wabash and Eel rivers at Logansport in northern Indiana. He was a child of Thomas C. and Lavina (née Walker) Whiteside. He had a sister, Matilda (Tillie; 6/14/1861-4/25/1884; married Charles K. Allen, 1880; had son, George Allen, 1883) Walker's family would later move to the Chicago suburb of Riverside where his father's law practice afforded them the luxury of two servants. In the years to come, Thomas Whiteside would serve as an Indiana state judge and as a member of the Indiana Supreme Court. Lavina Whiteside was born in Indiana, the daughter of Judge George B. Walker, a native of Maryland who had settled in Logansport.

Career
While in his teens or earlier, Walker Whiteside attended acting classes under the tutelage of Professor Samuel Kayzer of the Dramatic Conservatory of Chicago.  His ability there to play roles that would appear to be beyond his years soon drew local media attention as the boy tragedian of Chicago. In October 1884, the not yet sixteen-year-old actor hired Alderman Ford, a theatrical agent from Kansas City and, on November 17, made his professional stage debut in Richard III at Chicago's Grand Opera House. Walker found the experience both terrifying and exhilarating, but knew immediately he had found his calling.

He spent much of the following decade or so with Shakespearean companies, touring primarily America's Midwest, before making his New York premier in April 1893 at the Union Square Theatre, playing Hamlet and the title part in Edward Bulwer-Lytton's Richelieu. In 1894, Whiteside again performed Hamlet for the debut season of the Grand Opera House in Traverse City, Michigan. By the dawn of the 20th century, and barely into his thirties, Walker had played Hamlet in some 1,400 productions.

In the late 1890s, Walker began to swing away from classic production in favor of more contemporary and thus more profitable plays.  On January 31, 1901, just fifteen minutes after the final curtain call of Walker's play Heart and Sword, the Coates Opera House in Kansas City caught fire and burned to the ground. By the time the fire had spread from the boiler room, the building had been evacuated, forcing Walker's company to abandon their theatrical gear to the flames. Later, Walker signed with Shipman Brothers in New York, performing romantic and classic plays under their banner until he was able to recoup his losses.
Walker's first Broadway hit was in 1909, playing David opposite Chrystal Herne  in Israel Zangwill’s The Melting Pot. The play ran for 268 performances at the Comedy Theatre on West 41st Street, and nearly as long a few years later, when he reprieved his role at the Queen’s Theatre in London.

Walker's performance as Wu Li Chang in the play Mr. Wu was so popular that before the premier of a later play he had his press agent release a statement announcing "Mr. Whiteside wishes it known far and wide that this time he is not acting as a sinister Chinaman, educated at Oxford, who wears poison fingernails." Walker played several Asian characters over his career, some evil, at least one not, that were probably comparable to those portrayed in films made in Hollywood over the first half of the twentieth century. Walker Whiteside also appeared in the film adaptation of The Melting Pot in 1915 and three years later in the spy film, The Belgian, directed by Sidney Olcott.

The remainder of Walker's career would be a successful combination of performances on the road and on Broadway. During this period, his leading lady for seven seasons was New Orleans native Sydney Shields. For whatever reason, Walker had several plays that had popular runs on the road that he never brought to Broadway. Until his retirement in 1935, Walker had  a large following among Mid-American audiences who considered him one of their own.

Family
On October 19, 1893, in Hamilton, Ontario. Walker Whiteside married actress Leila Wolston McCord (professionally known as Leila Wolston)), the daughter of John Thomas McCord founder of the Mississippi River Steamship Line,  Two years later, the couple became the parents of Leila Rosamond, who would go on to be a vaudeville performer and a singer with the St. Louis Opera Company.

Death
Walker Whiteside died on August 17, 1942, at his family residence in Hastings-on-Hudson, a village in the town of Greenburgh, New York, just a few miles north of New York City. He never recovered from a stroke suffered three years earlier. Leila Whiteside died at Hastings-on-Hudson on January 3, 1944, after a short illness. Leila, as did her husband, had taken to the stage at an early age debuting in the play Alabama (1888) at the age of sixteen. She had been a member of Augustin Daly’s stock company for a number of seasons before joining her husband as a co-star in Shakespearean productions throughout much of the 1890s. She retired from the stage after a fifteen-year career.

Selected plays
 The Red Cockade (1899) adaptation/actor/producer (adapted from an English translation of Le Lion Amoureux by Francois Ponsard) 
 Heart and Sword (c. 1900) actor/producer/writer
 We Are King (1904) adaptation/actor/producer
 The Magic Melody (1907)
 The Typhoon (1912) actor/producer
 Mr. Wu (1914) actor/director
 The Pawn (1917) actor
 The Little Brother (1918) actor
 The Hindu (1922) actor/producer/writer
 The Arabian (1927) actor
 The Royal Box (1928) actor
 Sakura (1928) actor/producer
 Three Men and a Woman (1932) actor/director
 The Master of Ballantrae (1935) actor

References

External links

1869 births
1942 deaths
American male Shakespearean actors
19th-century American male actors
American male stage actors
20th-century American male actors